The Sloan Site is an archaeological site near Crowley’s Ridge in Arkansas which is recognized for being among the oldest documented cemeteries in the New World. The site contained Paleo-Indian Dalton graves with bone fragments and artifacts. It dates to about 12,000 years ago. The site was excavated by Dan Morse in 1974 and a results were originally published in 1997.

References 

Archaeology of the United States
Archaic period in North America
Paleo-Indian archaeological sites in the United States